The 2015 Oakland Athletics season was the 48th for the franchise in Oakland (all at O.co Coliseum), as well as the 115th in club history.

Offseason
On November 28, 2014, the Athletics traded Josh Donaldson to the Toronto Blue Jays for Brett Lawrie, Kendall Graveman, Sean Nolin, and Franklin Barreto.

Regular season

American League West

American League Wild Card

Record against opponents

Season summary

Game log

|- style="background:#bfb;"
| 1 || April 6 || Rangers || 8–0 || Gray (1–0) || Gallardo (0–1) || — || 36,067 || 1–0
|- style="background:#fbb;"
| 2 || April 7 || Rangers || 1–3 || Lewis (1–0) || Hahn (0–1) || Feliz (1) || 15,025 || 1–1
|- style="background:#bfb;"
| 3 || April 8 || Rangers || 10–0 || Kazmir (1–0) || Detwiler (0–1) || — || 19,479 || 2–1
|- style="background:#fbb;"
| 4 || April 9 || Rangers || 1–10 || Martinez (1–0) || Graveman (0–1) || — || 16,045 || 2–2
|- style="background:#bfb;"
| 5 || April 10 || Mariners || 12–0 || Pomeranz (1–0) || Walker (0–1) || — || 30,114 || 3–2
|- style="background:#fbb;"
| 6 || April 11 || Mariners || 4–5 (11) || Olson (1–0) || Abad (0–1) || Rodney (2) || 24,355 || 3–3
|- style="background:#fbb;"
| 7 || April 12 || Mariners || 7–8 (10) || Rodney (1–0) || Clippard (0–1) || Medina (1) || 32,282 || 3–4
|- style="background:#bfb;"
| 8 || April 13 || @ Astros || 8–1 || Kazmir (2–0) || Feldman (0–2) || — || 19,279 || 4–4
|- style="background:#bfb;"
| 9 || April 14 || @ Astros || 4–0 || Graveman (1–1) || Peacock (0–1) || — || 18,395 || 5–4
|- style="background:#fbb;"
| 10 || April 15 || @ Astros || 1–6 || McHugh (2–0)  || Pomeranz (1–1)  || – || 19,777 || 5–5
|- style="background:#fbb;"
| 11 || April 17 || @ Royals || 4–6 || Davis (2–0)  || Otero (0–1) || Holland (4) || 39,228 || 5–6
|- style="background:#bfb;"
| 12 || April 18 || @ Royals || 5–0 || Hahn (1–1) || Ventura (2–1) || Chavez (1) || 33,151 || 6–6
|- style="background:#fbb;"
| 13 || April 19 || @ Royals || 2–4 || Morales (1–0) || O'Flaherty (0–1)  || Davis (2) || 36,755 || 6–7
|- style="background:#bfb;"
| 14 || April 20 || @ Angels || 6–3 || Otero (1–1) || Shoemaker (2–1) || Clippard (1) || 35,228 || 7–7
|- style="background:#fbb;"
| 15 || April 21 || @ Angels || 1–14 || Santiago (2–1) || Pomeranz (1–2) || — || 32,137 || 7–8
|- style="background:#bfb;"
| 16 || April 22 || @ Angels || 9–2 || Gray (2–0) || Salas (0–1) || — || 30,034 || 8–8
|- style="background:#fbb;"
| 17 || April 23 || @ Angels || 0–2 || Tropeano (1–0) || Chavez (0–1) || Street (5) || 24,304 || 8–9
|- style="background:#fbb;"
| 18 || April 24 || Astros || 4–5 (11) || Gregerson (1–0) || O'Flaherty (0–2) || Qualls (2) || 18,205 || 8–10
|- style="background:#fbb;"
| 19 || April 25 || Astros || 3–9 || Feldman (2–2) || Graveman (1–2) || — || 24,342 || 8–11
|- style="background:#fbb;"
| 20 || April 26 || Astros || 6–7 || Sipp (2–0) || Clippard (0–2) || Gregerson (4) || 22,080 || 8–12
|- style="background:#bfb;"
| 21 || April 28 || Angels || 6–2 || Gray (3–0) || Weaver (0–3) || — || 17,674 || 9–12
|- style="background:#fbb;"
| 22 || April 29 || Angels || 3–6 || Morin (1–0) || Cook (0–1) || Street (8) || 16,212 || 9–13
|- style="background:#fbb;"
| 23 || April 30 || Angels || 5–6 || Richards (2–1) || Chavez (0–2) || Street (9) || 19,534 || 9–14
|-

|- style="background:#bfb;"
| 24 || May 1 || @ Rangers || 7–5 || Otero (2–1) || Mendez (0–1) || Clippard (2) || 29,700 || 10–14
|- style="background:#fbb;"
| 25 || May 2 || @ Rangers || 7–8 (10) || Kela (1–1) || Cook (0–2) || — || 32,207 || 10–15
|- style="background:#bfb;"
| 26 || May 3 || @ Rangers || 7–1 || Gray (4–0) || Gallardo (2–4) || — || 36,006 || 11–15
|- style="background:#fbb;"
| 27 || May 4 || @ Twins || 7–8 || Hughes (1–4) || Hahn (1–2) || Perkins (9) || 20,605 || 11–16
|- style="background:#bfb;"
| 28 || May 5 || @ Twins || 2–1 || Chavez (1–2) || May (2–2) || Clippard (3) || 18,135 || 12–16
|- style="background:#fbb;"
| 29 || May 6 || @ Twins || 0–13 || Gibson (3–2) || Kazmir (2–1) || — || 18,866 || 12–17
|- style="background:#fbb;"
| 30 || May 7 || @ Twins || 5–6 || Nolasco (2–1) || Pomeranz (1–3) || Perkins (10) || 22,379 || 12–18
|- style="background:#fbb;"
| 31 || May 8 || @ Mariners || 3–4 (11) || Smith (1–2) || Otero (2–2) || — || 25,187 || 12–19
|- style="background:#fbb;"
| 32 || May 9 || @ Mariners || 2–7 || Happ (3–1) || Hahn (1–3) || — || 37,441 || 12–20
|- style="background:#fbb;"
| 33 || May 10 || @ Mariners || 3–4 || Hernández (6–0) || Chavez (1–3) || Rodney (9) || 42,831 || 12–21
|- style="background:#fbb;"
| 34 || May 11 || Red Sox || 4–5 (11) || Barnes (1–0) || Castro (0–1) || — || 19,743 || 12–22
|- style="background:#bfb;"
| 35 || May 12 || Red Sox || 9–2 || Pomeranz (2–3) || Masterson (2–2) || — || 24,605 || 13–22
|- style="background:#fbb;"
| 36 || May 13 || Red Sox || 0–2 || Miley (2–4) || Gray (4–1) || Uehara (7) || 22,389 || 13–23
|- style="background:#fbb;"
| 37 || May 15 || White Sox || 6–7 || Carroll (1–1) || Abad (0–2) || Duke (1) || 21,464 || 13–24
|- style="background:#fbb;"
| 38 || May 16 || White Sox || 3–4 || Danks (2–3) || Rodriguez (0–1) || Robertson (8) || 28,445 || 13–25
|- style="background:#fbb;"
| 39 || May 17 || White Sox || 3–7 || Samardzija (3–2) || Kazmir (2–2) || — || 33,195 || 13–26
|- style="background:#bfb;"
| 40 || May 18 || @ Astros || 2–1 || Mujica (2–1) || Thatcher (0–1) || Clippard (4) || 21,724 || 14–26
|- style="background:#fbb;"
| 41 || May 19 || @ Astros || 4–6 || Hernández (2–3) || Gray (4–2) || Neshek (1) || 17,575 || 14–27
|- style="background:#fbb;"
| 42 || May 20 || @ Astros || 1–6 || Keuchel (6–0) || Hahn (1–4) || — || 21,066 || 14–28
|- style="background:#fbb;"
| 43 || May 21 || @ Rays || 0–3 || Colomé (3–1) || Chavez (1–4) || Boxberger (12) || 10,605 || 14–29
|- style="background:#fbb;"
| 44 || May 22 || @ Rays || 2–5 || Archer (5–4) || Kazmir (2–3) || Boxberger (13) || 12,329 || 14–30
|- style="background:#bfb;"
| 45 || May 23 || @ Rays || 5–0 || Graveman (2–2) || Karns (3–2) || — || 15,207 || 15–30
|- style="background:#bfb;"
| 46 || May 24 || @ Rays || 7–2 || Gray (5–2) || Ramírez (2–2) || — || 15,692 || 16–30
|- style="background:#bfb;"
| 47 || May 25 || Tigers || 4–0 || Hahn (2–4) || Greene (4–3) || — || 25,380 || 17–30
|- style="background:#fbb;"
| 48 || May 26 || Tigers || 0–1 || Price (4–1) || Chavez (1–5) || Soria (14) || 22,758 || 17–31
|- style="background:#fbb;"
| 49 || May 27 || Tigers || 2–3 || Ryan (1–0) || Otero (2–3) || Soria (15) || 20,387 || 17–32
|- style="background:#bfb;"
| 50 || May 28 || Yankees || 5–4 || Scribner (1–0) || Sabathia (2–7) || Clippard (5) || 21,795 || 18–32
|- style="background:#bfb;"
| 51 || May 29 || Yankees || 6–2 || Gray (6–2) || Capuano (0–3) || Clippard (6) || 23,540 || 19–32
|- style="background:#fbb;"
| 52 || May 30 || Yankees || 3–5 || Shreve (2–1) || Hahn (2–5) || Miller (15) || 25,223 || 19–33
|- style="background:#bfb;"
| 53 || May 31 || Yankees || 3–0 || Chavez (2–5) || Warren (3–4) || Clippard (7) || 25,457 || 20–33
|-

|- style="background:#bfb;"
| 54 || June 2 || @ Tigers || 5–3 || Graveman (3–2) || Simón (5–3) || Clippard (8) || 28,362 || 21–33
|- style="background:#bfb;"
| 55 || June 3 || @ Tigers || 6–1 || Gray (7–2) || Sánchez (3–7) || — || 30,718 || 22–33
|- style="background:#bfb;"
| 56 || June 4 || @ Tigers || 7–5 || Hahn (3–5) || Greene (4–5) || Clippard (9) || 37,411 || 23–33
|- style="background:#fbb;"
| 57 || June 5 || @ Red Sox || 2–4 || Miley (5–5) || Kazmir (2–4) || Uehara (12) || 34,910 || 23–34
|- style="background:#fbb;"
| 58 || June 6 || @ Red Sox || 2–4 || Kelly (2–4) || Chavez (2–6) || Uehara (13) || 36,713 || 23–35
|- style="background:#fbb;"
| 59 || June 7 || @ Red Sox || 4–7 || Wright (3–2) || Clippard (0–3) || Layne (1) || 36,913 || 23–36
|- style="background:#fbb;"
| 60 || June 9 || Rangers || 1–2 || Martinez (5–2) || Gray (7–3) || Tolleson (8) || 14,617 || 23–37
|- style="background:#bfb;"
| 61 || June 10 || Rangers || 5–4 || Clippard (1–3) || Kela (4–3) || — || 14,290 || 24–37
|- style="background:#bfb;"
| 62 || June 11 || Rangers || 7–0 || Kazmir (3–4) || Gonzalez (2–1) || — || 14,489 || 25–37
|- style="background:#fbb;"
| 63 || June 12 || @ Angels || 4–5 || Alvarez (1–1) || Scribner (1–1) || Street (18) || 42,113 || 25–38
|- style="background:#fbb;"
| 64 || June 13 || @ Angels || 0–1 || Wilson (4–5) || Graveman (3–3) || Street (19) || 43,540 || 25–39
|- style="background:#bfb;"
| 65 || June 14 || @ Angels || 8–1 || Gray (8–3) || Shoemaker (4–5) || — || 35,143 || 26–39
|- style="background:#bfb;"
| 66 || June 15 || @ Padres || 9–1 || Hahn (4–5) || Ross (3–7) || — || 30,018 || 27–39
|- style="background:#bfb;"
| 67 || June 16 || @ Padres || 6–5 || Scribner (2–1) || Kimbrel (1–2) || Clippard (10) || 28,482 || 28–39
|- style="background:#bfb;"
| 68 || June 17 || Padres || 16–2 || Chavez (3–6) || Despaigne (3–5) || — || 20,625 || 29–39
|- style="background:#fbb;"
| 69 || June 18 || Padres || 1–3 || Kennedy (4–5) || Graveman (3–4) || Kimbrel (17) || 16,643 || 29–40
|- style="background:#fbb;"
| 70 || June 19 || Angels || 7–12 || Salas (1–1) || Mujica (2–2) || — || 25,528 || 29–41
|- style="background:#bfb;"
| 71 || June 20 || Angels || 4–1 || Hahn (5–5) || Weaver (4–8) || Clippard (11) || 26,471 || 30–41
|- style="background:#bfb;"
| 72 || June 21 || Angels || 3–2 || Kazmir (4–4) || Richards (7–5) || Clippard (12) || 29,137 || 31–41
|- style="background:#bfb;"
| 73 || June 23 || @ Rangers || 8–6 || Chavez (4–6) || Gonzalez (2–2) || Pomeranz (1) || 35,889 || 32–41
|- style="background:#bfb;"
| 74 || June 24 || @ Rangers || 8–2 || Graveman (4–4) || Rodríguez (4–3) || — || 34,216 || 33–41
|- style="background:#bfb;"
| 75 || June 25 || @ Rangers || 6–3 || Gray (9–3) || Kela (4–5) || Clippard (13) || 29,251 || 34–41
|- style="background:#fbb;"
| 76 || June 26 || Royals || 2–5 || Vólquez (8–4) || Hahn (5–6) || Holland (15) || 27,365 || 34–42
|- style="background:#fbb;"
| 77 || June 27 || Royals || 2–3 || Young (7–3) || Kazmir (4–5) || Holland (16) || 28,619 ||34–43
|- style="background:#fbb;"
| 78 || June 28 || Royals || 3–5 || Guthrie (6–5) || Chavez (4–7) || Davis (9) || 22,477 || 34–44
|- style="background:#bfb;"
| 79 || June 29 || Rockies || 7–1 || Graveman (5–4) || Hale (2–3) || — || 12,125 || 35–44
|- style="background:#fbb;"
| 80 || June 30 || Rockies || 1–2 || de la Rosa (5–3) || Bassitt (0–1) || Hawkins (2) || 19,206 || 35–45
|-

|- style="background:#bfb;"
| 81 || July 1 || Rockies || 4–1 || Hahn (6–6) || Bettis (4–3) || Clippard (14) || 17,655 || 36–45
|- style="background:#bfb;"
| 82 || July 2 || Mariners || 4–0 || Kazmir (5–5) || Elias (4–6) || — || 13,062 || 37–45
|- style="background:#fbb;"
| 83 || July 3 || Mariners || 5–9 || Happ (4–5) || Chavez (4–8) || — || 35,067 || 37–46
|- style="background:#bfb;"
| 84 || July 4 || Mariners || 2–0 || Graveman (6–4) || Hernández (10–5) || Clippard (15) || 18,915 || 38–46
|- style="background:#fbb;"
| 85 || July 5 || Mariners || 1–2 || Montgomery (4–2)  || Bassitt (0–2)  || Rodney (16) || 22,163 || 38–47
|- style="background:#bfb;"
| 86 || July 7 || @ Yankees || 4–3 || Pomeranz (3–3)  || Betances (5–2) || Clippard (16) || 32,337 || 39–47
|- style="background:#fbb;"
| 87 || July 8 || @ Yankees || 4–5 || Sabathia (4–8) || Scribner (2–2) || Miller (18) || 41,626 || 39–48
|- style="background:#fbb;"
| 88 || July 9 || @ Yankees || 2–6 || Tanaka (5–3) || Chavez (4–9) || — || 40,084 || 39–49
|- style="background:#fbb;"
| 89 || July 10 || @ Indians || 1–5 || Salazar (8–4)  || Graveman (6–5) || Allen (19) || 28,539 || 39–50
|- style="background:#bfb;"
| 90 || July 11 || @ Indians || 5–4 || O'Flaherty (1–2) || McAllister (2–3) || Clippard (17) || 28,733 || 40–50
|- style="background:#bfb;"
| 91 || July 12 || @ Indians || 2–0 || Gray (10–3)  || Kluber (4–10)  || — || 20,611 || 41–50
|- style="background:#bbb;"
| – || July 14 || 86th All-Star Game || colspan=6 | National League vs. American League (Great American Ball Park, Cincinnati)
|- style="background:#fbb;"
| 92 || July 17 || Twins || 0–5 || Santana (1–0)  || Gray (10–4) || — || 23,462 || 41–51
|- style="background:#bfb;"
| 93 || July 18 || Twins || 3–2 (10) || Pomeranz (4–3)  || Fien (2–4) || — || 30,778 || 42–51
|- style="background:#bfb;"
| 94 || July 19 || Twins || 14–1 || Chavez (5–9)  || Milone (5–2)  || — || 20,286 || 43–51
|- style="background:#fbb;"
| 95 || July 21 || Blue Jays || 1–7 || Buehrle (11–5)  || Graveman (6–6)  || — || 19,364 || 43–52
|- style="background:#bfb;"
| 96 || July 22 || Blue Jays || 4–3 (10)  || Rodriguez (1–1)  || Osuna (1–4)  || — || 18,827 || 44–52
|- style="background:#fbb;"
| 97 || July 23 || Blue Jays || 2–5 || Dickey (4–10)  || Otero (2–4)  || Schultz (1) || 19,045 || 44–53
|- style="background:#fbb;"
| 98 || July 24 || @ Giants || 3–9 || Peavy (2–4) || Chavez (5–10) || — || 42,128  || 44–54
|- style="background:#fbb;"
| 99 || July 25 || @ Giants || 1–2 || Bumgarner (11–5) || Bassitt (0–3) || Casilla (25) || 42,162 || 44–55
|- style="background:#fbb;"
| 100 || July 26 || @ Giants || 3–4 || Hudson (6–8) || Graveman (6–7) || Casilla (26) || 42,034 || 44–56
|- style="background:#bfb;"
| 101 || July 28 || @ Dodgers || 2–0 || Gray (11–4) || Anderson (5–6) || — || 50,182 || 45–56
|- style="background:#fbb;"
| 102 || July 29 || @ Dodgers || 7–10 || Báez (3–2) || Pomeranz (4–4) || — || 51,788 || 45–57
|- style="background:#fbb;"
| 103 || July 30 || Indians || 1–3 || Carrasco (11–8) || Bassitt (0–4) || — || 13,173 || 45–58
|- style="background:#fbb;"
| 104 || July 31 || Indians || 1–2 || Salazar (9–6) || Mujica (2–3) || Allen (21) || 28,152 || 45–59
|-

|- style="background:#bfb;"
| 105 || August 1 || Indians || 5–1 || Brooks (1–0) || Anderson (2–3) || — || 19,046 || 46–59
|- style="background:#bfb;"
| 106 || August 2 || Indians || 2–1 (10)  || Rodriguez (2–1) || Allen (1–3) || — || 21,498 || 47–59
|- style="background:#fbb;"
| 107 || August 3 || Orioles || 2–9 || Wilson (2–1) || Chavez (5–11) || — || 11,476 || 47–60
|- style="background:#bfb;"
| 108 || August 4 || Orioles || 5–0 || Bassitt (1–4) || González (9–8) || — || 16,328 || 48–60
|- style="background:#fbb;"
| 109 || August 5 || Orioles || 3–7 || Britton (2–0) || León (0–1) || — || 20,176 || 48–61
|- style="background:#fbb;"
| 110 || August 6 || Astros || 4–5 (10) || Gregerson (5–1) || Mujica (2–4) || Harris (1) || 16,172 || 48–62
|- style="background:#bfb;"
| 111 || August 7 || Astros || 3–1 || Gray (12–4) || Keuchel (13–6) || — || 18,908 || 49–62
|- style="background:#bfb;"
| 112 || August 8 || Astros || 2–1 || Chavez (6–11) || McHugh (13–6) || Mujica (1) || 25,091 || 50–62
|- style="background:#bfb;"
| 113 || August 9 || Astros || 5–4 || Abad (1–2) || Gregerson (5–2) || — || 20,278 || 51–62
|- style="background:#fbb;"
| 114 || August 11 || @ Blue Jays || 2–4 || Hutchison (11–2) || Graveman (6–8) || Osuna (11) || 39,381 || 51–63
|- style="background:#fbb;"
| 115 || August 12 || @ Blue Jays || 3–10 || Dickey (7–10) || Brooks (1–1) || — || 44,597 || 51–64
|- style="background:#fbb;"
| 116 || August 13 || @ Blue Jays || 2–4 || Burhrle (13–5) || Chavez (6–12) || Osuna (12) || 46,902 || 51–65
|- style="background:#fbb;"
| 117 || August 14 || @ Orioles || 6–8 (13) || Garcia (1–0) || Pomeranz (4–5) || — || 36,784 || 51–66
|- style="background:#fbb;"
| 118 || August 15 || @ Orioles || 3–4 || Britton (3–0) || Venditte (0–1) || — || 44,028 || 51–67
|- style="background:#fbb;"
| 119 || August 16 || @ Orioles || 2–18 || Chen (7–6) || Graveman (6–9) || — || 28,228 || 51–68
|- style="background:#fbb;"
| 120 || August 17 || @ Orioles || 2–4 || Tillman (9–7) || Gray (12–5) || Britton (29) || 22,766 || 51–69
|- style="background:#bfb;"
| 121 || August 18 || Dodgers || 5–4 (10) || Abad (2–2) || García (3–3) || — || 35,067 || 52–69
|- style="background:#bfb;"
| 122 || August 19 || Dodgers || 5–2 || Chavez (7–12) || Wood (8–8) || Pomeranz (2) || 26,122 || 53–69
|- style="background:#fbb;"
| 123 || August 21 || Rays || 1–2 || Smyly (1–2) || Bassitt (1–5) || Boxberger (30) || 20,671 || 53–70
|- style="background:#fbb;"
| 124 || August 22 || Rays || 4–5 || Colomé (6–4) || Venditte (0–2) || — || 36,067 || 53–71
|- style="background:#bfb;"
| 125 || August 23 || Rays || 8–2 || Rodriguez (3–1) || Geltz (2–5) || — || 19,425 || 54–71
|- style="background:#bfb;"
| 126 || August 24 || @ Mariners || 11–5 || Mujica (3–4) || Iwakuma (5–3) || — || 17,970 || 55–71
|- style="background:#fbb;"
| 127 || August 25 || @ Mariners || 5–6 || Olmos (1–0) || Chavez (7–13) || Wilhelmsen (4) || 17,498 || 55–72
|- style="background:#fbb;"
| 128 || August 26 || @ Mariners || 2–8 || Hernández (15–8) || Bassitt (1–6) || — || 23,338 || 55–73
|- style="background:#fbb;"
| 129 || August 28 || @ Diamondbacks || 4–6 || Delgado (5–3) || Gray (12–6) || Ziegler (24) || 30,059 || 55–74
|- style="background:#bfb;"
| 130 || August 29 || @ Diamondbacks || 3–2 || Rodriguez (4–1) || Chafin (5–1) || Pomeranz (3) || 35,990 || 56–74
|- style="background:#bfb;"
| 131 || August 30 || @ Diamondbacks || 7–4 (11) || Venditte (1–2) || Ziegler (0–2) || — || 29,576 || 57–74
|- style="background:#bfb;"
| 132 || August 31 || Angels || 11–5 || Doubront (2–1) || Santiago (7–9) || — || 12,054 || 58–74
|-

|- style="background:#fbb;"
| 133 || September 1 || Angels || 2–6 || Shoemaker (7–9) || Martin (2–4) || — || 14,178 || 58–75
|- style="background:#fbb;"
| 134 || September 2 || Angels || 4–9 || Heaney (6–2) || Gray (12–7) || — || 13,392 || 58–76
|- style="background:#fbb;"
| 135 || September 4 || Mariners || 8–11 || Ramírez (1–0) || Brooks (1–2) || Wilhelmsen (9) || 16,382 || 58–77
|- style="background:#fbb;"
| 136 || September 5 || Mariners || 3–8 || Hernández (16–8) || Chavez (7–14) || — || 27,387 || 58–78
|- style="background:#fbb;"
| 137 || September 6 || Mariners || 2–3 || Iwakuma (7–3) || Nolin (0–1) || Wilhelmsen (10) || 19,534 || 58–79
|- style="background:#bfb;"
| 138 || September 7 || Astros || 10–9 || Doubront (3–1) || Fiers (7–10) || Doolittle (1) || 22,214 || 59–79
|- style="background:#bfb;"
| 139 || September 8 || Astros || 4–0 || Gray (13–7) || Kazmir (7–10) || — || 11,364 || 60–79
|- style="background:#fbb;"
| 140 || September 9 || Astros || 5–11 || McHugh (16–7) || Brooks (1–3) || — || 13,387 || 60–80
|- style="background:#fbb;"
| 141 || September 11 || @ Rangers || 0–4 || Lewis (15–8) || Chavez (7–15) || — || 28,133 || 60–81
|- style="background:#bfb;"
| 142 || September 12 || @ Rangers || 5–3 || Nolin (1–1) || Gallardo (12–10) || — || 30,487 || 61–81
|- style="background:#fbb;"
| 143 || September 13 || @ Rangers || 4–12 || Gonzalez (3–5) || Doubront (3–2) || — || 26,131 || 61–82
|- style="background:#fbb;"
| 144 || September 14 || @ White Sox || 7–8 (14) || Jennings (2–3) || León (0–2) || — || 12,221 || 61–83
|- style="background:#bfb;"
| 145 || September 15 || @ White Sox || 17–6 || Brooks (2–3) || Samardzija (9–13) || — || 12,446 || 62–83
|- style="background:#fbb;"
| 146 || September 16 || @ White Sox || 4–9 || Johnson (2–0) || Martin (2–5) || — || 13,005 || 62–84
|- style="background:#bfb;"
| 147 || September 17 || @ White Sox || 4–2 || Doolittle (1–0) || Robertson (6–4) || — || 12,406 || 63–84
|- style="background:#bfb;"
| 148 || September 18 || @ Astros || 4–3 || Pomeranz (5–5) || Neshek (3–6) || Dull (1) || 27,567 || 64–84
|- style="background:#fbb;"
| 149 || September 19 || @ Astros || 6–10 || Qualls (3–4) || Rodriguez (4–2) || — || 27,044 || 64–85
|- style="background:#fbb;"
| 150 || September 20 || @ Astros || 1–5 || McHugh (17–7) || Brooks (2–4) || — || 22,453 || 64–86
|- style="background:#fbb;"
| 151 || September 22 || Rangers || 6–8 || Gonzalez (4–5) || Pomeranz (5–6) || Tolleson (33) || 16,524 || 64–87
|- style="background:#fbb;"
| 152 || September 23 || Rangers || 3–10 || Lewis (17–8) || Doubront (3–3) || — || 16,445 || 64–88
|- style="background:#fbb;"
| 153 || September 24 || Rangers || 1–8 || Hamels (11–8) || Bassitt (1–7) || — || 14,452 || 64–89
|- style="background:#bfb;"
| 154 || September 25 || Giants || 5–4 || Gray (14–7) || Leake (10–10) || Doolittle (2) || 36,067 || 65–89
|- style="background:#fbb;"
| 155 || September 26 || Giants || 10–14 || Osich (2–0) || Dull (0–1) || Casilla (36) || 36,067 || 65–90
|- style="background:#fbb;"
| 156 || September 27 || Giants || 4–5 || Heston (12–10) || Nolin (1–2) || Casilla (37) || 36,067 || 65–91
|- style="background:#fbb;"
| 157 || September 28 || @ Angels || 4–5 || Gott (4–2) || Mujica (3–5) || — || 31,858 || 65–92
|- style="background:#fbb;"
| 158 || September 29 || @ Angels || 1–8 || Tropeano (3–2) || Bassitt (1–8) || — || 33,470 || 65–93
|- style="background:#bfb;"
| 159 || September 30 || @ Angels || 8–7 || Dull (1–1) || Morin (3–2) || Doolittle (3) || 34,033 || 66–93
|-

|- style="background:#bfb;"
| 160 || October 2 || @ Mariners || 4–2 || Brooks (3–4) || Farquhar (1–8) || Doolittle (4) || 26,130 || 67–93
|- style="background:#bfb;"
| 161 || October 3 || @ Mariners || 7–5 (13) || Venditte (2–2) || Ramírez (1–2) || Doubront (1) || 24,448 || 68–93
|- style="background:#fbb;"
| 162 || October 4 || @ Mariners || 2–3 || Kensing (2–1) || Dull (1–2) || Wilhelmsen (13) || 22,402 || 68–94
|-

|-
| Legend:       = Win       = Loss       = PostponementBold = Athletics team member

Roster

Statistics

Batting
Note: G = Games played; AB = At bats; R = Runs scored; H = Hits; 2B = Doubles; 3B = Triples; HR = Home runs; RBI = Runs batted in; BB = Base on balls; SO = Strikeouts; AVG = Batting average; SB = Stolen bases

Pitching
Note: W = Wins; L = Losses; ERA = Earned run average; G = Games pitched; GS = Games started; SV = Saves; IP = Innings pitched; H = Hits allowed; R = Runs allowed; ER = Earned runs allowed; HR = Home runs allowed; BB = Walks allowed; K = Strikeouts

Farm system

LEAGUE CHAMPIONS: Midland

References

External links

2015 Oakland Athletics season at Baseball Reference
2015 Oakland Athletics season Official Site

Oakland Athletics seasons
Oakland Athletics
2010s in Oakland, California
Oak